Niccolò Cassana (often called Nicoletto; 1659–1714) was an Italian painter born in Venice and active during the late-Baroque. His older brother Giovanni Agostino Cassana was also a painter.

He trained with his father, Giovanni Francesco Cassana, a Genoese painter, who had been taught the art of painting by Bernardo Strozzi. He painted a Conspiracy of Catiline for the  Gallery at Florence. Having painted portraits of the Medici court, and also of some of the English nobility, Nicoletto was invited to England, and introduced to Queen Anne, who sat to him for her likeness, and conferred on him many marks of favor. He died in London in 1714, having given way to drinking in his later years.

One of his pupils was Fortunato Pasquetti.

See also
Cassana (family)

References

Gallery

1659 births
1713 deaths
17th-century Italian painters
Italian male painters
18th-century Italian painters
Painters from Venice
Italian Baroque painters
18th-century Italian male artists